Gawłówek may refer to the following places in Poland:
Gawłówek, Lesser Poland Voivodeship (southern Poland)
Gawłówek, Masovian Voivodeship (east-central Poland)